Darlene Remembers Duke, Jonathan Plays Fats is a 1982 album by Jo Stafford and Paul Weston in which they perform in character as Jonathan and Darlene Edwards. The duo present their own unique interpretation of the music of Duke Ellington and Fats Waller, with Stafford singing deliberately off-key, and Weston deliberately fumbling his way through piano arrangements. It was issued by Corinthian Records (COR-117). When it was released, Billboard said of it: "The sounds they achieve may well lead to another Grammy for the duo next year." Stafford and Weston, in their Jonathan and Darlene Edwards personas, were interviewed by Los Angeles Magazine following the album's release.

Track listing

Side 1

 Ain't Misbehavin
 Sophisticated Lady
 Honeysuckle Rose
 I'm Beginning to See the Light
 I'm Gonna Sit Right Down and Write Myself a Letter
 Take the "A" Train

Side 2

 Keepin' out of Mischief
 Mood Indigo
 Black and Blue
 Don't Get Around Much Anymore
 I've Got a Feeling I'm Falling
 Do Nothin' til You Hear From Me

References

1982 albums
Jonathan and Darlene Edwards albums
Corinthian Records albums
1980s comedy albums